Fabian Andres Monge (born 12 July 2001) is an Australian professional footballer who plays as a central midfielder for NPL NSW club APIA Leichhardt.

Career

Western Sydney Wanderers
Monge was part of the 2017-18 Y-League championship winning Western Sydney Wanderers Youth team. He played 71 minutes as they beat Melbourne City Youth 3–1 in the 2018 Y-League Grand Final on 3 February 2018.

On 8 February 2019, Monge signed his first professional contract with the Wanderers, penning a two-year scholarship deal with the club. After a standout 2018–19 Y-League campaign, which culminated in a 3–1 loss to Brisbane Roar Youth in the 2019 Y-League Grand Final, he was named the league's Player of the Year at the Dolan Warren Awards.

He made his professional debut on 18 September 2019 in a 2019 FFA Cup quarter-final clash against Melbourne City, replacing Mathieu Cordier in the 66th minute as the Wanderers went on to lose 3–0.

On 28 December 2020, The club announced that he had departed the club along with Mohamed Adam and Noah Pagden.

Sydney Olympic
On 21 January 2021, Sydney Olympic FC announced they had signed Monge.

Honours

Club
Western Sydney Wanderers
Y-League: 2017–18

Honours

International
Australia U20
AFF U-19 Youth Championship: 2019

Australia U17
AFF U-16 Youth Championship: 2016

Individual
Y-League Player of the Year: 2018–19

References

External links

2001 births
Living people
Australian people of Argentine descent
Australian soccer players
Association football midfielders
Western Sydney Wanderers FC players
National Premier Leagues players